The flag of Bolivia is the national flag of the Plurinational State of Bolivia. It was originally adopted in 1851. The state and war flag is a horizontal tricolor of red, yellow and green with the Bolivian coat of arms in the center. According to one source, the red stands for Bolivia's brave soldiers, while the green symbolizes fertility and yellow the nation's mineral deposits.

According to the revised Constitution of Bolivia of 2009, the Wiphala is considered a national symbol of Bolivia (along with the tricolor flag, national anthem, coat of arms, the cockade; kantuta flower and patujú flower).

Despite its landlocked status, Bolivia has a naval ensign used by navy vessels on rivers and lakes.  It consists of a blue field with the state flag in the canton bordered by nine small yellow five-pointed stars, with a larger yellow five-pointed star in the fly.  The nine small stars represent the nine departments of Bolivia, and the larger star the nation's right to access the sea (access that it lost in 1884 in the War of the Pacific).

Description

Design and dimensions
The national flag of Bolivia is described as a tricolor rectangle, with the colors red, yellow and green, in a ratio of 1:1:1, meaning three horizontal bands, with the red on the superior part occupying a third of the flag's width, yellow in the middle band using the same width, and green in the inferior part, using the last third.

The dimensions of the flag had not been defined since its adoption in 1851. Supreme Decree No. 27630 of 2004 finally established that the size of the national flag be of 7.5 squares width by 11 squares long, giving a ratio of 15:22.

Color and symbolism
The first description of Bolivia's national flag, together with the significance of these, were first established by the Supreme Decree of 1888 during the government of President Gregorio Pacheco, which specifies that:

 
 
 

The exact colors of the Bolivian flag have been established by the Supreme Decree of 2004:

The colours of the tricolor can also be found in the Bolivian Wiphala. The Wiphala has been included into the national colours of the Bolivian Air Force such as on the executive Dassault Falcon 900EX. The Wiphala is also officially flown on governmental buildings such as the Palacio Quemado and parliament alongside the tricolor since the introduction of the revised 2009 constitution.

Historical flags

The current Bolivian flag has been officially adopted 31 October 1851 during the presidency of Manuel Isidoro Belzu.

According to Supreme Decree No. 27630 of 19 July 2004, during the presidency of Carlos Mesa, it was established that the civil flag used in civic, public and patriotic celebrations will be used without the National Shield, instead the flag used by the state in official acts it will include in its central part the shield
During the presidency of Evo Morales, through Supreme Decree No. 241 of 5 August 2009, some symbolic modifications were made to the flag. It was also established that for both the civil flag and the flag used by the State in official acts they should be raised on the right side and the wiphala on the left side.

See also

Coat of arms of Bolivia
Flag of the Patujú flower
Wiphala
Flag of Hungary, nearly identical design (white stripe instead of yellow)
Flag of Ghana, nearly identical design (defaced with a black five-pointed star)

References

External links

 
National symbols of Bolivia
Bolivia
1851 establishments in Bolivia
Bolivia
Flags displaying animals